Chabab Riadhi Baladiat Ouled Djellal, known as CRB Ouled Djellal or simply CRBOD is an Algerian football club located in Ouled Djellal, Algeria. The club was founded in 1931 and its colours are red and white. Their home stadium, Stade Lamri Benkouider, has a capacity of 5,000 spectators. The club is currently playing in the Algerian Ligue 2.

On August 5, 2020, CRB Ouled Djellal promoted to the Algerian Ligue 2.

Current squad 
As of 1 November 2020:

References

External links 

Football clubs in Algeria